Kamenska is an uninhabited village in Požega-Slavonia County, Croatia. Kamenska is administered as a part of the Brestovac municipality. The village is connected by the D38 state road.

Demographics
According to the 2011 census, the village of Kamenska is no longer inhabited.

The 1991 census recorded that 92.50% of the village population were ethnic Serbs (37/40), 2.50% were ethnic Croats (1/40), and 5.00% were of other ethnic origin (2/40).

Sights
 Monument to the victory of the people of Slavonia

References 

Former populated places in Croatia
Serb communities in Croatia